Lizzo is the recipient of a number of awards, including four Grammy Awards, a Primetime Emmy Award, two Soul Train Music Awards, a Billboard Music Award, a BET Award, and a Guinness World Record. At the 62nd Annual Grammy Awards she received eight nominations, the most for any artist that year, including for Album of the Year for the deluxe version of Cuz I Love You, Record of the Year and Song of the Year for "Truth Hurts", winning the categories Best Urban Contemporary Album, Best Traditional R&B Performance for "Jerome" and Best Pop Solo Performance.

Awarded 2 iHeartRadio Music Awards along with the accomplishment of reaching 1 Billion Total Audience Spins for “Truth Hurts” & “Good as Hell”.

At the 2020 BET Awards, Lizzo became the first act to be nominated in both the R&B/pop and hip-hop artist categories in the same year.

In 2021, Lizzo was given honorary membership into Tau Beta Sigma National Honorary Band Sorority, Incorporated.

Awards and nominations

Notes

References 

Lizzo